State Route 100 (SR 100) is a  unsigned state highway completely within the city limits of Andalusia in Covington County. The western terminus of the highway is at an intersection with U.S. Route 29 (US 29) in the southwestern part of Andalusia. The eastern terminus of the highway is at an intersection with US 84 in the east-central part of the city.

Route description

SR 100 begins at an intersection with US 29 in the southwestern part of Andalusia. It heads east on two-lane undivided Sanford Road. The road travels through residential areas and crosses the Three Notch Railroad. The highway passes more residences before turning northeast into wooded areas. SR 100 reaches its eastern terminus at an intersection with US 84.

History

SR 100 was designated in 1962 along the route of a southern bypass of Andalusia.

Until 1957, SR 100 was assigned to a road from Elm Bluff to Riley; the southern portion was replaced by the new SR 21, and the remainder was renumbered as SR 89.

Major intersections

See also

References

External links

100
Transportation in Covington County, Alabama